Zografou is a suburb of approximately 71,000 in the eastern part of the Athens agglomeration, Greece.  It was named after the Greek politician Ioannis Zografos. To the east of Zografou lies mount Hymettus. The area, being close to the centre of Athens, developed similar urban sprawl characteristics, with high-rise buildings of even 10 stories tall being the norm. The municipality is also home to the National and Kapodistrian university of Athens and National Technical university of Athens campuses and therefore, a great part of its population is university students. Zografou includes the smaller areas of Ilissia and Goudi.

Geography

Zografou is an inner suburb of Athens, located about 4 km east of Athens city centre. The municipality has an area of 8.517 km2. Towards the east the municipality extends to the forested Hymettus mountain. The built-up area of Zografou is continuous with that of mucipality of Athens. A large campus of the National and Kapodistrian University of Athens is situated in Ano Ilisia, the easternmost quarter of Zografou. Ano Ilisia derived its name from the river Ilisos, which starts at St Eleousa, now in the University campus. Another quarter of Zografou is Goudi, in the northwestern part of the municipality. The main church of Zografou is consecrated to Agios Therapontas (Greek: Άγιος Θεράποντας). With Zografou having been built on the hills of Hymettus, a common sight around the suburb are some very steep uphill streets.

Transport

Zografou is served by bus lines 140 (Polygono - Glyfada),  220 (Ano Ilisia - Akadimia), 221 (Panepistimioupoli - Akadimia), 230 (Akropoli - Zografou),  235 (Zografou - Akadimia), 250 (Panepistimioupoli - Evangelismos station), 608 (Galatsi - Akadimia - Nekr. Zografou), 622 (Goudi - Ano Galatsi) and 815 (Goudi - Tavros). The eastern beltway Motorway 64 passes through the municipality.

At summer of 2029, Zografou will have 3 metro stations at Ilissia, Zografou (Gardenia Place) and Goudi.

History
After the departure of the Ottomans from the area in the 1830s, the area came into the ownership of Ioannis Koniaris, mayor of Athens from 1851 to 1854, and Leonidas Vournazos.

In 1902, Eleni Vournazos, widow of Leonidas, sells 1,250 stremmata (1 stremma equal to 1000 square meters ) of the Kouponia/Goudi area to Ioannis Zografos (died 1927), a Member of Parliament for the Nationalist Party and university professor. Dividing it into plots, he sold them for installments of 112 drachma per month. The first houses were erected in 1919. Within ten years, 100 had been built. At this time, the foundations of the Church of St. Theraponta were erected.

In 1929, the area, now known as Zografou, was split from the municipality of Athens and became an independent community. It was elevated to a municipality in 1947, its first president being Sotirios Zografos, the son of Ioannis. In 1935, the area of Kouponia (now Ano Ilisia) was incorporated into the community.

Scientific Centers, Museums and others
 Dimitri Kitsikis Public Foundation"
Gounaropoulos Museum, dedicated to the works of painter Giorgios Gounaropoulos. It was founded in 1979.
Marika Kotopouli Museum, a museum of modern art, founded in 1990 and housed in the 1926 villa of actress Marika Kotopouli

Sports
Zografou hosts the local sport teams Asteras Zografou, football club founded in 1965 and Filathlitikos B.C., basketball club founded in 1986. In addition, the sport club Ilisiakos, founded in 1927, is based in Ilisia a district that is shared between Municipalities of Athens and Zografou.

Historical population

Notable people 
Giannis Antetokounmpo (1994–) professional basketball player
Kostas Antetokounmpo (1997–) professional basketball player
Thanasis Antetokounmpo (1992–) professional basketball player
Kostas Eftaxias (1986–present) exceptional Civil Engineer
Dimitri Kitsikis (1935–2021) Royal Society of Canada
Marika Kotopouli (1887–1954) actress
Nikos Kourkoulos (1934–2007) actor

Gallery

See also
List of municipalities of Attica

References

External links

City of Zografou official website 
News site for City of Zografou 

Municipalities of Attica
Populated places in Central Athens (regional unit)